Hangzhou historic houses are artifacts, buildings, or districts in Hangzhou, China, which have been legally declared to be "protected". According to the "Regulations of historic districts and historic buildings in Hangzhou" effectivated from 1 January 2005, historic buildings are those artifacts or districts that have lasted more than 50 years, and are of significant value for history, science, and art. In Hangzhou, declaring a historic house requires consulting the urban planning administration bureau, and the real estate administration bureau.

As of 31 June 2011, there were 287 declared historic buildings in Hangzhou, proclaimed in 5 batches. In the near future the sixth batch will be issued, which includes 51 historic houses.

The following information has been sourced from the Real Estate Administration Bureau in Hangzhou, the Research Institute for Historic Buildings in Hangzhou, and the Hangzhou Memory website.

First batch

75 buildings were declared to be the first batch of historic houses in Hangzhou, May 2004.

Second batch

Third batch

Fourth batch

Fifth batch

See also

References

Buildings and structures in Hangzhou
Hangzhou
History of Hangzhou